Tobias Read (born July 1, 1975) is an American politician who is the current Oregon State Treasurer. He was a member of the Oregon House of Representatives, representing District 27 from 2007–2017, which comprises parts of Beaverton, southwest Portland, and unincorporated Multnomah and Washington Counties. He served as Speaker Pro Tempore, and was formerly the Democratic Majority Whip.

In 2016, Read ran for Oregon State Treasurer, to succeed State Treasurer Ted Wheeler, who was barred from running in 2016 by term limits. Read won the general election on November 8, 2016 and became the State Treasurer in January 2017. He was reelected in 2020 by a wider margin. He was a candidate for governor of Oregon in the 2022 election, losing to Tina Kotek in the Democratic primary.

Early life and education
Read was born in 1975 in Missoula, Montana. After attending high school in Idaho, he moved to Oregon where he graduated from Willamette University in 1997 with a bachelor's degree in politics and economics. In 2003, he earned an MBA from the University of Washington in Seattle. He and his wife, Heidi Eggert, have two children, Annika, and Ellis.

Career
In 1997, he started working for Nike, Inc. in footwear development, where he remained until 2012. He also worked for the United States Department of the Treasury as an aide to then-Secretary Lawrence Summers from 1999 to 2001. His immediate supervisor was Sheryl Sandberg.

Read served in the Oregon State Legislature from 2007 to 2016 as the Representative from the 27th district. As a legislator, Read was a strong advocate for fully funding Oregon's full-day kindergarten; supported state investments in green tech jobs and research through Oregon Inc and other initiatives; worked to stabilize state funding and enhance the state's Rainy Day funds; and sponsored legislation to redirect unclaimed funds from class action lawsuits to legal assistance for low income Oregonians; rather than back to the original corporate wrongdoers. Throughout his legislative career, he sought to expand savings in Oregon's college savings program, and sponsored legislation to create additional options for retirement savings for Oregonians.

During his time in the Oregon House, Read served as House Majority Whip, and in 2015 he was elected Speaker Pro Tempore. He served as chair of the House Committee on Transportation and Economic Development and the House Committee on Higher Education, Innovation, and Workforce Development. He also served on the House Revenue Committee and the Joint Committee on Ways and Means, the committee of the Legislature primarily responsible for writing the state budget.

State Treasurer

In 2016, Read ran for Oregon State Treasurer, to succeed Ted Wheeler, who was barred by term limits from running again in 2016. He was unopposed in the primary and won the general election by a plurality in November 2016, defeating Republican Jeff Gudman and became the State Treasurer in January 2017. Since the 2019 death Secretary of State Dennis Richardson, Read has been first in the line of succession for the office of Governor. As Oregon does not have a lieutenant governor position, the Secretary of State is normally the first to succeed the governor in the event of a vacancy. However, as Richardson's successor Bev Clarno is an appointee, she is ineligible to become Governor, making Read first in the line of succession.

First State Retirement Savings Plan 

In 2015, in an effort led by Read and organizations such as SEIU and AARP, the Oregon Legislature enacted legislation which created the Oregon Retirement Savings Board and tasked it with establishing a state-run retirement savings program and managing its oversight. The retirement program created was called OregonSaves. In 2018, Finance industry publication Pensions & Investments and the Defined Contribution Institutional Investment Association (DCIIA) honored Read and OregonSaves with the Excellence & Innovation Award. The award recognizes public and private-sector efforts to enhance retirement security. In 2019 Read was invited to speak to the U.S. Senate Finance Committee on the states innovative approach to retirement savings.

Sale of Elliott State Forest
In 2017, Read voted to sell 82,500 acres of the Elliott State Forest to a Roseburg-based timber company for $221 million. Revenues from the sale would have been added to the state's education fund. Following pushback from environmentalist and other Oregon Democrats, Read withdrew his support for the proposal.

Oregon College Savings Plan
As Treasurer, Read oversees the Oregon College Savings Program (OCSP), which helps Oregonians save for education after high school.

Read worked with the Oregon State Legislature to pass the Education Savings Credit which changes the tax advantage from a deduction to a refundable credit. Begun in 2020, the Education Savings Credit makes it easier for low-to-moderate income families save for education after high school. Read worked with a diverse group of organizations including the Latina Network, Stand for Children, and the Oregon Student Association and legislators to pass the Education Savings Credit.

2022 Oregon gubernatorial run
On September 27, 2021, Read officially announced that he was running for governor, but lost in the Democratic primary to Tina Kotek.

General elections

References

External links 

 Government website
 Tobias Read for Governor campaign website
 Oregon State House – Tobias Read legislative website (archived)

 Follow the Money – Tobias Read
  campaign contributions

|-

1975 births
21st-century American politicians
Capital High School (Boise, Idaho) alumni
Living people
Democratic Party members of the Oregon House of Representatives
Nike, Inc. people
Politicians from Beaverton, Oregon
Politicians from Missoula, Montana
State treasurers of Oregon
University of Washington Foster School of Business alumni
Willamette University alumni